Sanja is a South Slavic feminine given name, meaning "she dreams".

Notable persons with this name

Sanja Ančić (born 1988), Croatian tennis player
Sanja Bestic (born 1982), Serbian-American director, writer and producer
Sanja Bizjak (born 1988), Serbian pianist
Sanja Bogosavljević (born 1979), Serbian singer
Sanja Damjanović (born 1972), Montenegrin physicist and minister of science
Sanja Doležal (born 1963), Croatian singer and television host
Sanja Đorđević (born 1969), Montenegrin turbo-folk singer
Sanja Gavrilović (born 1982), Croatian hammer thrower
Sanja Grohar (born 1984), Slovenian model and singer
Sanja Ilić (born 1951), Serbian composer, keyboardist and architect
Sanja Iveković (born 1949), Croatian photographer, sculptor and installation artist
Sanja Jovanović (born 1986), Croatian swimmer
Sanja Knežević (born 1984), Montenegrin basketball player
Sanja Malagurski (born 1990), Serbian volleyball player
Sanja Maletić (born 1973), Bosnian pop-folk singer
Sanja Mandić (born 1995), Serbian basketball player
Sanja Matejaš or Sanya Mateyas, Croatian–American actress and singer
Sanja Nikčević (born 1960), Croatian theatre critic and professor of theatre history
Sanja Orozović (born 1990), Serbian basketball player
Sanja Ožegović (born 1959), Yugoslav basketball player
Sanja Papić (born 1984), Serbian model and beauty pageant contestant
Sanja Popović (born 1984), Croatian volleyball player
Sanja Premović (born 1992), Montenegrin handball player
Sanja Radosavljević (born 1994), Serbian handball player
Sanja Rajović (born 1981), Serbian handball player
Sanja Starović (born 1983), Serbian volleyball player
Sanja Štiglic (born 1970), Slovenian civil servant, diplomat and politician
Sanja Stijačić (born 1965), Serbian flautist and professor
Sanja Vejnović (born 1961), Croatian actress
Sanja Vučić (born 1993), Serbian singer
Sanja Vujović (born 1987), Serbian handball player

See also
 Sanja (disambiguation)
 Sanya (name)
 Sania (name)
 Shania (given name)

Serbian feminine given names